This is a list of Indian soups and stews. Indian cuisine consists of cooking traditions and practices from the Indian subcontinent, famous for its traditional rich tastes and diverse flavours.

Indian soups and stews

 Sambar  (romanized: Sāmbār) is a lentil-based vegetable stew, cooked with pigeon pea and tamarind broth. It is popular in South Indian and Sri Lankan cuisines.

 Kadhi, or karhi, is a dish originating from the Rajasthan. It consists of a thick gravy based on gram flour, and contains vegetable fritters called pakoras, to which dahi (yogurt) is added to give it a bit of sour taste. It is often eaten with cooked rice or roti.
 Dal makhani (pronounced [d aː l (ˈmək.kʰə.ni]) is a dish originating in New Delhi, India. It is made with urad dal (black beans) and other pulses, and includes butter and cream (makhan is Hindi for butter).
 Korma, or qorma, is a dish originating in South Asia, consisting of meat or vegetables braised with yogurt (dahi), water or stock, and spices to produce a thick sauce or gravy.
 Paya is a traditional meat stew originating in the Indian subcontinent. Recipes for this dish vary regionally. The soup base is created by sautéed onions and garlic, where a number of curry-based spices are then added to the meat and bones. The cooked dish is served with a garnish of fresh diced ginger and fresh long coriander leaves, along with fresh sliced lemon.
 Macho Jhol is a spicy Assamese fish curry, made with potato, chillies, ginger and garlic.
 Hyderabadi marag, or marag, is a spicy mutton soup served as a starter in Hyderabad, India and part of Hyderabadi cuisine. It is prepared from tender mutton with bone. It is thin soup. The soup has become one of the starters at Hyderabadi weddings.
 Aloo mutter is a vegetarian North Indian dish from the Indian subcontinent which is made from potatoes (Aloo) and peas (mattar) in a mildly spiced creamy tomato based gravy. It is a vegetarian dish. The gravy base is generally cooked with garlic, ginger, onion, tomatoes, cilantro (coriander), cumin seeds, red chilli, turmeric, garam masala, and many other spices. It can also be made without onion or garlic.
 Vindaloo, or vindalho, is an Indian curry dish, which is originally from Goa. It is known globally in its British Indian form as a staple of curry house and Indian restaurant menus, and is often regarded as a fiery, spicy dish.
 Keema matar (English: "peas and mince"), also rendered "keema matar", is a dish from the Indian subcontinent, made from minced meat and peas.
 Kosha mangsho (also referred to as Mutton curry or lamb curry) is a dish that is prepared from goat meat (or sometimes lamb meat) and vegetables.
 Mulligatawny is a soup which originated from South Indian cuisine.

See also

 List of soups
 List of stews
 List of Indian dishes

References

External links
 

Soups and stews